Yathin Reddy (born 26 November 1993) is an Indian cricketer who plays for Hyderabad. He made his List A debut on 13 December 2015 in the 2015–16 Vijay Hazare Trophy.

References

External links
 

1993 births
Living people
Indian cricketers
Hyderabad cricketers
Cricketers from Hyderabad, India